Mycena asterina is a species of agaric fungus in the family Mycenaceae.  It is found in São Paulo state, Brazil, where it grows singly or scattered on fallen leaves in Atlantic forests. The fruit bodies of the fungus are bioluminescent.

See also 
List of bioluminescent fungi

References

External links 

asterina
Bioluminescent fungi
Fungi described in 2007
Fungi of Brazil